Kimberly Jean Brown is an American actress, best known to audiences for her portrayal of the teen witch Marnie Piper in the Halloweentown films, in which she starred alongside Debbie Reynolds. Before being cast as Marnie, Brown found notoriety for her role as Marah Lewis on Guiding Light, the third actress to take on the role, and as Annie Wheaton in the Rose Red miniseries, an original miniseries written by Stephen King. She also starred in the acclaimed movie Tumbleweeds.

Career
Brown's career began when she was very young. By the time she was 11 years old, Brown had already enjoyed success as a child model with Ford Models, performed in multiple Broadway shows and earned an Emmy nomination for her portrayal of Marah Lewis on Guiding Light. She also found work as a voice actress, lending her voice to commercials, A Bug's Life and the English dub of Vampire Princess Miyu.

At the age of 13, Brown was cast in her most notable film, the Disney Channel Original Movie Halloweentown, in which she played 13-year-old Marnie Piper, a young witch who is determined to learn magic from her grandmother Aggie, portrayed by Debbie Reynolds. In September 2016, Brown recalled her audition for the film when she had to react to the conversation where it was revealed the character Marnie is a witch. Brown read for the role twice before being cast. Halloweentown aired on October 17, 1998, and was well received by audiences, leading Disney Channel to produce three sequels; Brown reprised her role as Marnie in two of them. She was replaced by Sara Paxton in the fourth installment, Return to Halloweentown, a decision over which Brown expressed confusion and disappointment. Fans of the franchise were unhappy with Paxton's portrayal of the character and some major entertainment outlets were critical. BuzzFeed said that the first three films were the best thing about Halloween while the fourth film was best left ignored, while MTV said fans should act as if the fourth film had never happened. Outside of Halloweentown, Brown also starred in another Disney Channel original movie, the 2000 film Quints. In 1999, Brown co-starred with Janet McTeer in Tumbleweeds. The film received positive reviews.

In May 2021, it was announced she had joined the cast of General Hospital.

Other ventures
Brown and a friend run the Etsy shop CraftilyCreative, which sells a variety of items, including Halloweentown-themed merchandise.

In 2016, Brown published a Halloween-themed children's book, Poppin's Pumpkin Patch Parade, with co-author Diane Yslas.

Personal life
In a 2010 interview, Brown said that she was close to graduating from college, though she did not disclose what her major was or the school at which she was studying. She later revealed in 2018 that she had received a Bachelor of Science degree in Business.

In 2016, she reconnected with Halloweentown II co-star Daniel Kountz for a Halloweentown-themed project for Brown's YouTube channel, and they soon began dating. In June 2022, Brown announced their engagement.

Filmography

Film

Television

References

External links
 
 

Actresses from Maryland
American child actresses
American film actresses
American musical theatre actresses
American stage actresses
American soap opera actresses
American television actresses
Living people
20th-century American actresses
21st-century American actresses
Year of birth missing (living people)